Boring is a surname. Notable people with the surname include:

Alice Middleton Boring (1883–1955), American biologist, zoologist, and herpetologist
Edwin G. Boring (1886–1968), American experimental psychologist
Floyd Boring (1915–2008), American Secret Service agent
Mel Boring (Melvin Lyle Boring, born 1939), American children's author, father of Jeremy Boring Davies
Wayne Boring (1905–1987), American comic book artist best known for his work on Superman in the 1940s and 1950s
William A. Boring (1859–1937), American architect who co-designed the Immigration Station at Ellis Island in New York harbor
William H. Boring (1841–1932), American soldier; settler and namesake of Boring, Oregon

See also 
David Boring, a graphic novel
Jeremy Davies (Jeremy Boring Davies, born 1969), American actor, son of Mel Boring
 Boring (disambiguation)